Omorgus fenestrellus is a species of hide beetle in the subfamily Omorginae and subgenus Afromorgus.

References

fenestrellus
Beetles described in 1939